The Buen Formation is a geologic formation and Lagerstätte in Peary Land, North Greenland. The shale preserves fossils dating back to the Early Cambrian period (Atdabanian in the local timescale, about 520 to 513 Ma).

Description 

The oldest Cambrian series of the area was deposited in the Franklinian Basin and is poorly exposed in fragmentary, heavily metamorphosed outcrops in Peary Land. It was emplaced during the Ellesmerian orogeny.

Paleogeography 

During the Cambrian, Greenland was located in the southern tropical to temperate region. The Buen Formation forms part of the southern shelf succession of the Franklinian Basin of North Greenland and the Canadian Arctic Islands. Dark grey to black mudstones form part of this transitional succession from the shelf to the slope. To the south they lie in faulted contact with pale dolomites of the underlying Portfjeld Formation, and to the north with bioturbated mudstones and sandstones of the Buen Formation.

Fossil content 
The following fossils have been reported from the formation:

See also 

 List of fossiliferous stratigraphic units in Greenland
 Sirius Passet

References

Bibliography 

 
 
   Material was copied from this source, which is available under a Creative Commons Attribution 4.0 International License.

Further reading 
 A. C. Daley and J. S. Peel. 2010. A Possible Anomalocaridid from the Cambrian Sirius Passet Lagerstätte, North Greenland. Journal of Paleontology 84(2):352-355
 C. B. Skovsted and J. S. Peel. 2011. Hyolithellus in life position from the Lower Cambrian of north Greenland. Journal of Paleontology 85(1):37-47
 G. E. Budd and J. S. Peel. 1998. A new xenusiid lobopod from the Early Cambrian Sirius Passet fauna of North Greenland. Palaeontology 41(6):1201-1213
 J. K. Rigby. 1986. Cambrian and Silurian sponges from North Greenland. Rapport Groenlands Geologiske Undersoegelse 132:51-63
 M. Williams, D. J. Siveter, and J. S. Peel. 1996. Isoxys (arthropoda) from the Early Cambrian Sirius Passet Lagerstaette, North Greenland. Journal of Paleontology 70(6):947-954
 S. Conway Morris and J. S. Peel. 1990. Articulated halkieriids from the Lower Cambrian of north Greenland. Nature 345(28):802-805

 
Geologic formations of Greenland
Cambrian System of North America
Cambrian System of Europe
Cambrian Greenland
Mudstone formations
Sandstone formations
Shale formations
Open marine deposits
Fossiliferous stratigraphic units of North America
Fossiliferous stratigraphic units of Europe
Paleontology in Greenland
Peary Land